Walter Jr. may refer to
 Walter White Jr., a character in Breaking Bad
 Walt Lemon Jr., an American professional basketball player
 Walt Frazier (full name Walter Frazier Jr.), an American former basketball player
 Walter Cronkite (full name Walter Leland Cronkite Jr.), an American broadcast journalist
 Walter A. Haas Jr., chairman of Levi Strauss & Co from 1970 to 1981
 Walter Scott Jr., an American civil engineer
 Walter M. Miller Jr., an American science fiction writer
 Walter Bishop Jr., an American jazz pianist
 Wally Schirra (full name Walter Marty Schirra Jr.), an American naval aviator, test pilot, and NASA astronaut
 Walter P. Chrysler Jr., an American art collector and museum benefactor
 Walter Junior - a 1930s Czech aero-engine also built under license as the P.Z. Inż. Junior